Italy competed at the 1980 Winter Olympics in Lake Placid, United States.

Medalists

Alpine skiing

Men

Women

Biathlon

Men

Men's 4 x 7.5 km relay

 1 A penalty loop of 150 metres had to be skied per missed target.
 2 One minute added per close miss (a hit in the outer ring), two minutes added per complete miss.

Bobsleigh

Cross-country skiing

Men

Men's 4 × 10 km relay

Figure skating

Women

Luge

Men

(Men's) Doubles

Women

Ski jumping

Speed skating

Men

Women

See also
 Italy at the FIS Alpine World Ski Championships 1980

References
Official Olympic Reports
International Olympic Committee results database
 Olympic Winter Games 1980, full results by sports-reference.com

Nations at the 1980 Winter Olympics
1980
Winter